The Senate Standing Committee on Foreign Affairs and International Trade (AEFA) is a standing committee of the Senate of Canada, active since 1938. As a standing committee, the rules of the Senate re-establish the committee at the opening of every new session (otherwise the committee would permanently dissolve).

Role
The mandate of the Committee is to examine legislation and matters that relate to Canada's foreign, Commonwealth and NAFTA relations, policies and agreements.

Members 

The Representative of the Government in the Senate and Leader of the Opposition in the Senate are both ex-officio members of the committee.

References
 

Committees of the Senate of Canada
Foreign relations of Canada